George Walter de la Warr (19 August 1904 – 31 March 1969) was born in the Northern England, and in later life became a civil engineer in the pay of Oxfordshire County Council. In 1953 he resigned from this post to work within the discredited field of radionics, in which he was a pioneer. His devices were denounced by medical experts.

Career

Warr was influenced by the devices of Albert Abrams. He claimed to have invented a camera that could detect and cure diseases by remote control. In June 1960, he was sued in the High Court by Catherine Phillips, a disgruntled former customer who said that her health had been ruined by using the Delawarr Diagnostic Instrument. In particular, she said that the box could not possibly have the benefits that de la Warr claimed for it. Warr said that his device operated above the physical plane, and the box was only used as a focus for thought. After ten days of argument, the judge eventually found for de la Warr, but considered the box to be bogus.

He founded the De La Warr Laboratories in Oxford where he did his research and built many radionic devices. The De La Warr Laboratories closed in 1987. Most of the radionic artifacts have unknown whereabouts. However, the radionic camera was given to Marcel J. Vogel, Psychic Research Inc. in San Jose, California. Vogel and Dan Willis did extensive tests and trials with the camera. Vogel died in 1992. The whereabouts of the camera since then is unknown.

Leslie Weatherhead who had known Warr, had supported his devices.

Criticism

Warr's radionic devices have been criticized by health experts as quackery. Warr was also notable for making unproven claims such using a photograph of insecticide on his machine to kill pests in a field miles away.

Patents
French patent number   1,084,318  –  "Perfectionnements à la recherche d'une radiation fondamentale"
UK patent number         741,651  –  "Therapeutic apparatus"
UK patent number         761,976  –  "Therapeutic apparatus"

Publications
Experiments Relating to Increases in Crop Yield by Radionic Stimulation (1955)
New Worlds Beyond the Atom (1959)

References

Further reading
Wallace Sampson, Lewis Vaughn. (2000). Science Meets Alternative Medicine: What the Evidence Says about Unconventional Treatments. Prometheus Books. 

1904 births
1969 deaths
English civil engineers